The John N. and Cornelia Watson House is a historic house located in Lakeview, Oregon.

Description and history
Built in 1905 the house reflects Queen Anne and Stick architectural styles. The historic owner, John Watson, was nominated by Theodore Roosevelt and confirmed by the United States Senate for register of the land office in Lakeview in 1903. The property was listed on the National Register of Historic Places on February 21, 1989.

See also
 Historic preservation
 National Register of Historic Places listings in Lake County, Oregon

References

External links
 
 

1905 establishments in Oregon
Buildings and structures in Lakeview, Oregon
Houses completed in 1905
Houses in Lake County, Oregon
Houses on the National Register of Historic Places in Oregon
National Register of Historic Places in Lake County, Oregon
Queen Anne architecture in Oregon
Stick-Eastlake architecture in Oregon